"All n My Grill" is the second single from Missy "Misdemeanor" Elliott's 1999 album, Da Real World. The song featured Big Boi of Outkast and vocal ad-libs from her former protégé, Nicole Wray. The song had more success than the first single, "She's a Bitch".

In European markets, another version of the song featuring French rapper MC Solaar was released adding French rap lyrics performed by MC Solaar. This bilingual English/French version became a charting hit in Belgium, France, Netherlands, Germany and Sweden. This version had appeared as a bonus track on the album Da Real World as an alternative to then main version featuring Big Boi and Nicole Wray.

The song was a hit in the UK as well with the promo single featuring MC Solaar being remixed by Boy George and Kinky Roland.

The main sample of the song is Dernier Domicile Connu composed by François de Roubaix.

Music video
The video was directed by Hype Williams and featured Nicole Wray and Big Boi. The video starts with Elliott in a car singing. She gets out of the car and starts singing the rest of the song walking down a street. Nicole Wray is singing in a car for most of the video. There are people dancing around in yellow rain coats in the rain. At the end, Big Boi raps in the middle of the street. The video premiered on TV in August 1999.

Track listings

UK Single
12" Promo 
"All N My Grill" (Boy George & Kinky Roland Mix) (featuring MC Solaar) - 6:43

CD Maxi-Single 
"All N My Grill" (Edit) (featuring MC Solaar) - 3:34
"All N My Grill" (Radio Edit) (featuring Nicole Wray & Big Boi) - 3:58
"All N My Grill" (Album Version) (featuring MC Solaar) - 4:47

US Single
12" Single  
Side A
"All N My Grill" (Edit) (featuring Nicole Wray & MC Solaar) - 3:34
"All N My Grill" (Radio Edit) (featuring Nicole Wray & Big Boi) - 3:38
Side B
"All N My Grill" (Instrumental) - 4:32
"All N My Grill" (Clean Version) (featuring Nicole Wray & Big Boi) - 4:32

Europe Single
CD Single 
"All N My Grill" (Edit) (featuring MC Solaar) - 3:34
"All N My Grill" (Album Version) (featuring MC Solaar) - 4:47

Charts

(All positions for version featuring MC Solaar, except positions for US featuring Big Boi and Nicole Wray)

Year-end charts

References

1999 singles
Missy Elliott songs
Big Boi songs
Nicole Wray songs
Song recordings produced by Timbaland
Songs written by Missy Elliott
Songs written by Timbaland
Songs written by Big Boi
Elektra Records singles
1998 songs